The 2015–16 Delaware Fightin' Blue Hens men's basketball team represented the University of Delaware during the 2015–16 NCAA Division I men's basketball season. The Fightin' Blue Hens, led by ninth year head coach Monté Ross, played their home games at the Bob Carpenter Center and were members of the Colonial Athletic Association. They finished the season 7–23, 2–16 in CAA play to finish in last place. They lost in the first round of the CAA tournament to the College of Charleston.

On March 18, head coach Monté Ross was fired. He finished at Delaware with a ten-year record of 132–184.

Previous season 
The Fightin' Blue Hens finished the season 10–20, 9–9 in CAA play to finish in a tie for sixth place. They lost in the quarterfinals of the CAA tournament to Northeastern.

Departures

Recruiting
Delaware did not have any incoming players in the 2015 recruiting class.

Roster

Schedule

|-
!colspan=9 style="background:#00539f; color:#FFD200;"| Non-conference regular season

|-
!colspan=9 style="background:#00539f; color:#FFD200;"| CAA regular season

|-
!colspan=9 style="background:#00539f; color:#FFD200;"| CAA tournament

See also
2015–16 Delaware Fightin' Blue Hens women's basketball team

References

Delaware Fightin' Blue Hens men's basketball seasons
Delaware
Delaware Fightin' Blue Hens men's b
Delaware Fightin' Blue Hens men's b